In enzymology, a glucose-1-phosphate adenylyltransferase is an enzyme that catalyzes the chemical reaction

ATP + alpha-D-glucose 1-phosphate  diphosphate + ADP-glucose

Thus, the two substrates of this enzyme are ATP and alpha-D-glucose 1-phosphate, whereas its two products are diphosphate and ADP-glucose.

This enzyme belongs to the family of transferases, specifically those transferring phosphorus-containing nucleotide groups (nucleotidyltransferases).  The systematic name of this enzyme class is ATP:alpha-D-glucose-1-phosphate adenylyltransferase. Other names in common use include ADP glucose pyrophosphorylase, glucose 1-phosphate adenylyltransferase, adenosine diphosphate glucose pyrophosphorylase, adenosine diphosphoglucose pyrophosphorylase, ADP-glucose pyrophosphorylase, ADP-glucose synthase, ADP-glucose synthetase, ADPG pyrophosphorylase, ADP:alpha-D-glucose-1-phosphate adenylyltransferase and AGPase.  This enzyme participates in starch and sucrose metabolism.

Structural studies

References

 
 

EC 2.7.7
Enzymes of known structure